Psalm 7 is the seventh psalm of the Book of Psalms, beginning in English in the King James Version: "O LORD my God, in thee do I put my trust: save me from all them that persecute me, and deliver me". In Latin, it is known as "Domine Deus meus in te speravi". Its authorship is traditionally assigned to King David. The message in the psalm is that the righteous may seem weak, but ultimately will prevail against the wicked.

The psalm forms a regular part of Jewish, Catholic, Lutheran, Anglican and other Protestant liturgies. It has been set to music, and has inspired hymns.

Text

Hebrew Bible version 
The following is the Hebrew text of Psalm 7:

King James Version 
 O LORD my God, in thee do I put my trust: save me from all them that persecute me, and deliver me:
 Lest he tear my soul like a lion, rending it in pieces, while there is none to deliver.
 O LORD my God, If I have done this; if there be iniquity in my hands;
 If I have rewarded evil unto him that was at peace with me; (yea, I have delivered him that without cause is mine enemy:)
 Let the enemy persecute my soul, and take it; yea, let him tread down my life upon the earth, and lay mine honour in the dust. Selah.
 Arise, O LORD, in thine anger, lift up thyself because of the rage of mine enemies: and awake for me to the judgment that thou hast commanded.
 So shall the congregation of the people compass thee about: for their sakes therefore return thou on high.
 The LORD shall judge the people: judge me, O LORD, according to my righteousness, and according to mine integrity that is in me.
 Oh let the wickedness of the wicked come to an end; but establish the just: for the righteous God trieth the hearts and reins.
 My defence is of God, which saveth the upright in heart.
 God judgeth the righteous, and God is angry with the wicked every day.
 If he turn not, he will whet his sword; he hath bent his bow, and made it ready.
 He hath also prepared for him the instruments of death; he ordaineth his arrows against the persecutors.
 Behold, he travaileth with iniquity, and hath conceived mischief, and brought forth falsehood.
 He made a pit, and digged it, and is fallen into the ditch which he made.
 His mischief shall return upon his own head, and his violent dealing shall come down upon his own pate.
 I will praise the LORD according to his righteousness: and will sing praise to the name of the LORD most high.

Structure 
The seventh psalm is a Psalm of David, and one of the Lamentations of an individual. A possible outline the psalm is as follows:
 Verse 2f: calling upon God for help
 Verse 4–6: protestation of innocence
 Verse 7–10: achieving desires of the Last Judgment over his enemies
 Verse 11f: comforting certainty to YHWH
 Verse 13–17: Comparison of the wicked enemy the world court
 Verse 18: Vows.

Superscription 
 A shiggaion of David, which he sang to the Lord concerning Cush, a Benjamite.
This line is verse 1 in Hebrew texts. The Hebrew word shiggayon, which appears in the superscription, is of unknown meaning, perhaps indicating an emotional song.

Uses

Judaism 
Psalm 7 is recited on Purim.

In Protestant revivalism 

Jonathan Edwards used some of the imagery from Psalm 7 in his 1741 sermon Sinners in the Hands of an Angry God.
   
Psalm 7:12–13 was used in Sinners in the Hands of an Angry God as:

A takeoff on this imagery used by the book by Brian Zahnd is Sinners in the hands of a loving God.

The arrow imagery will occur 15 times in Psalms, of God, of His enemies and even of children of blessed people.

Catholicism 
Around 530, St. Benedict of Nursia choose this psalm for the Tuesday office of Prime. According to the rule of St. Benedict, it was the first of three psalms. This tradition is still respected in a number of monasteries.

In the Liturgy of the Hours, Psalm 7 is recited during the Office of Midday on Mondays in the first week of the four weekly cycle of liturgical prayers.

Musical settings 
Heinrich Schütz wrote a setting of a paraphrase of Psalm 7 in German, "Auf dich trau ich, mein Herr und Gott", SWV 103, for the Becker Psalter, published first in 1628.

References

External links 

 
 
  in Hebrew and English - Mechon-mamre
 Text of Psalm 7 according to the 1928 Psalter
 A plaintive song of David, which he sang to the LORD concerning Cush, the Benjaminite. / LORD my God, in you I trusted text and footnotes, usccb.org United States Conference of Catholic Bishops
 Psalm 7:1 introduction and text, biblestudytools.com
 Psalm 7 – Confidence in God's Deliverance enduringword.com
 Psalm 7 / Refrain: Give judgement for me according to my righteousness, O Lord. Church of England
 Psalm 7 at biblegateway.com
 Hymns for Psalm 7 hymnary.org

007
Works attributed to David